The 2013 Indianapolis motorcycle Grand Prix was the tenth round of the 2013 MotoGP season. It was held at the Indianapolis Motor Speedway in Indianapolis on 18 August 2013.

Ben Spies crashed heavily in practice, and the resulting injuries caused the end of his racing career.

Classification

MotoGP

Moto2

Moto3

Championship standings after the race (MotoGP)
Below are the standings for the top five riders and constructors after round ten has concluded.

Riders' Championship standings

Constructors' Championship standings

 Note: Only the top five positions are included for both sets of standings.

References

Indianapolis motorcycle Grand Prix
Indianapolis
Indianapolis motorcycle Grand Prix
Indianapolis motorcycle Grand Prix
Indianapolis motorcycle Grand Prix